The 2008 Challenge Bell was a tennis tournament played on indoor carpet courts. It was the 16th edition of the Challenge Bell, and was part of the Tier III tournaments of the 2008 WTA Tour. It was held at the PEPS de l'Université Laval in Quebec City, Canada, from October 27 through November 2, 2008.

Entrants

Seeds

1 Rankings are as of October 13, 2008

Other entrants
The following players received wildcards into the singles main draw
 Sharon Fichman
 Marie-Ève Pelletier
 Valérie Tétreault

The following players received entry from the qualifying draw:
 Carly Gullickson
 Varvara Lepchenko
 Rebecca Marino
 Maria Mokh

The following player received entry as a lucky loser:
 Angela Haynes

Withdrawals
Before the tournament
 Flavia Pennetta (personal reasons)

Champions

Singles

 Nadia Petrova def.  Bethanie Mattek, 4–6, 6–4, 6–1

Doubles

 Anna-Lena Grönefeld /  Vania King def.  Jill Craybas /  Tamarine Tanasugarn, 7–6(7–3), 6–4

External links
Official website

Challenge Bell
Tournoi de Québec
Challenge Bell
2000s in Quebec City